Comfort Farms is a 2020 documentary film distributed by Gravitas Ventures. The film explores some of the people and events at Comfort Farms, a veteran therapy farm founded by former combat army Ranger and farmer Jon Jackson. The film was directed by Carlisle Kellam and features interviews with combat veterans Trenton Free, Jon Jackson, C. Sabathne, Forest Giles Jr. and Scott Kennedy. The film won Grand Jury Prize for Best Documentary Feature at Film Invasion Los Angeles in 2020.

References

External links 
 

2020 documentary films
American documentary films
Films about veterans
2020 films
2020s English-language films
2020s American films